The Labouchere was a paddle steamer in the service of the Hudson's Bay Company, 
built in 1858 at Green's in Blackwall, London, England. Under the command of Captain J. Trivett it was mostly in service in British Columbia and the rest of the Pacific Northwest in the 1850s and 1860s, including the Stikine lisière in Russian America. In 1859, its then-captain John Swanson was elected by a "celebrated" majority of one (there was only one qualified elector) in the colonial riding of Nanaimo for the Legislative Assembly of the Colony of Vancouver Island.

By 1865-66 the Labouchere served the San Francisco to Victoria run. On its second run on that route, under the command of W.A. Mouat and carrying 100 passengers and cargo on behalf of Faulkner, Bell & Co., the Labouchere was grounded in heavy fog off Point Reyes after disembarking San Francisco  on 14 April 1866 and, after backing off the reef and staying offshore overnight, sank on the morning of the 15th. One of eight lifeboats was swamped, incurring the loss of two lives. Those in the lifeboats were picked up by Rescue ; 23 men who had stayed on board were rescued by the Italian fishing vessel Andrew  just before the Labouchere sank beneath the waves.

Legacy 

Labouchere Channel and Labouchere Point, on the northeast end of King Island in the Dean Channel area of the Central Coast of British Columbia, near Bella Coola, and Labouchere Passage near Drury Inlet farther south, are named after the Labouchere. The vessel was named for Henry Labouchere who was colonial secretary from 1855 to 1858. Labouchere Bay on Prince of Wales Island in Alaska was named for the sidewheeler Labouchere.

See also
List of ships in British Columbia

References 

Coast of British Columbia
Pre-Confederation British Columbia
Maritime history of California
Paddle steamers
Shipwrecks of the California coast
Ships built by the Blackwall Yard
Hudson's Bay Company ships
1866 in California